The 1986 Tirreno–Adriatico was the 21st edition of the Tirreno–Adriatico cycle race and was held from 6 March to 12 March 1986. The race started in Ladispoli and finished in San Benedetto del Tronto. The race was won by Luciano Rabottini of the Vini Ricordi–Pinarello–Sidermec team.

General classification

References

1986
1986 in Italian sport
1986 Super Prestige Pernod International